Ernest Thralls House was a historic home located at Wayne Township in Greene County, Pennsylvania. The house was built in 1939–1940, and is a -story, concrete block dwelling in the Spanish Revival-style.  It measures 64 feet wide and 51 feet deep, and has terraces on the front and rear. Also on the property are a contributing tenant house (c. 1940), three sheds, a horse barn, open sheep shed, pig shed, and chicken coop.

The house was demolished several years after it was damaged in 2000 by subsidence caused by Consol Energy's Blacksville No. 2 longwall mine.  A new one story house now sits near the site of the previous house.

The Ernest Thralls House was listed on the National Register of Historic Places in 1999.

References 

Houses on the National Register of Historic Places in Pennsylvania
Houses completed in 1940
Houses in Greene County, Pennsylvania
National Register of Historic Places in Greene County, Pennsylvania